Patentable, statutory or patent-eligible subject matter is subject matter which is susceptible of patent protection. The laws or patent practices of many countries provide that certain subject-matter is excluded from patentability, even if the invention is novel and non-obvious. Together with criteria such as novelty, inventive step or nonobviousness, utility, and industrial applicability, which differ from country to country, the question of whether a particular subject matter is patentable is one of the substantive requirements for patentability.

Legislations 
The subject-matter which is regarded as patentable as a matter of policy, and correspondingly the subject-matter which is excluded from patentability as a matter of policy, depends on the national legislation or international treaty.

Canada 

According to the Canadian Intellectual Property Office (CIPO) patents may only be granted for physical embodiments of an idea, or a process that results in something that is tangible or can be sold. This excludes theorems and computer programs per se. However, business methods are patentable.

European Patent Convention 

The European Patent Convention does not provide any positive guidance on what should be considered an invention for the purposes of patent law.  However, it provides in  a non-exhaustive list of what are not to be regarded as inventions, and therefore not patentable subject matter:

 then qualifies Art. 52(2) EPC by stating:

(In a previous EPC version some further items are excluded under , as formally being not industrially applicable, notable medical methods as applied by a physician or a veterinarian. Nowadays these methods are excluded directly under Art. 53 EPC, together with other policy exclusions).

Practice at the European Patent Office 

Under , "European patents shall be granted for any inventions, in all fields of technology, provided that they are new, involve an inventive step and are susceptible of industrial application." So, four questions need to be assessed:
Is there an invention?
Is the invention susceptible of industrial application?
Is the invention novel?
Does the invention involve an inventive step?

The first question "Is there an invention?" is equivalent to: "Is the claimed subject-matter as a whole within the realm of patentable subject-matter?" The invention question or patentable subject-matter question precedes the three further questions, which cannot, and need not, be assessed if there is no invention.

According to the case law of the Boards of Appeal of the EPO, the question "Is there an invention?" also implicitly implies the further question: "Does the claimed subject-matter have a technical character?" "Having technical character is an implicit requirement of the EPC to be met by an invention to be an invention within the meaning of ".

Patentable subject-matter considerations also intervene again at a secondary level, during the inventive step assessment. In T 641/00 (Comvik/Two Identities), the Board held that, "An invention consisting of a mixture of technical and non-technical features and having technical character as a whole is to be assessed with respect to the requirement of inventive step by taking account of all those features which contribute to said technical character whereas features making no such contribution cannot support the presence of inventive step." The non-technical features are the ones that are excluded from the realm of patentable subject-matter as a matter of policy. T 258/03 (Hitachi/Auction Method) further developed this test for patentable subject-matter.

Under this test, a patent application or patent which does not provide a technical solution to a technical problem would be refused (under ) or revoked (under ) as lacking inventive step.

The European Patent Office provides guidelines for evaluating the patent-eligibility of computer-implemented inventions (CII), such as in particular based on Artificial Intelligence (AI). For instance, AI-based image processing programs are considered technical and therefore patent-eligible. Conversely, AI-based text processing programs with a text classification only based on the content of the text are not considered technical. These are excluded from patentability because attaching meaning to words is a cognitive task and not a technical implementation.

Practice in the United Kingdom
Following the 2006 Court of Appeal judgment in Aerotel v Telco and Macrossan's application, which contains a lengthy discussion of case law in the area, the UKPO has adopted the following test:
 (1) properly construe the claim
 (2) identify the actual contribution
 (3) ask whether it falls solely within the excluded subject matter
 (4) check whether the actual or alleged contribution is actually technical in nature.

The Court decided that the new approach provided a structured and more helpful way of applying the statutory test for assessing patentability which was consistent with previous decisions of the Court.

This test is quite different from the test used by the EPO, as expressed in T 641/00 (Comvik/Two Identities) and T 258/03 (Hitachi/Auction Method), but it is considered that the end result will be the same in nearly every case.

United States 

Section 101 of Title 35 U.S.C. sets out the subject matter that can be patented:

In October 2005, the United States Patent and Trademark Office (USPTO) issued interim guidelines for patent examiners to determine if a given claimed invention meets the statutory requirements of being a useful process, manufacture, composition of matter or machine. These guidelines assert that a process, including a process for doing business, must produce a concrete, useful and tangible result to be patentable. It does not matter whether the process is within the traditional technological arts or not. A price for a financial product, for example, is considered to be a concrete useful and tangible result (see State Street Bank v. Signature Financial Group).  However, on August 24, 2009, the USPTO issued new interim guidelines so that examination would comport with the Federal Circuit opinion in In re Bilski, which held that the "useful, concrete, and tangible" test for patent-eligibility is incorrect and that State Street Bank v. Signature Financial Group is no longer valid legal authority on this point.  Instead, the Federal Circuit and the new USPTO guidelines use a machine-or-transformation test to determine patentability for processes.  The Supreme Court determined that the claims in the Bilski case covered non-statutory subject matter as it was too abstract and broad.

The USPTO has reasserted its position that literary works, compositions of music, compilations of data, legal documents (such as insurance policies), and forms of energy (such as data packets transmitted over the Internet), are not considered "manufactures" and hence, by themselves, are not patentable. Nonetheless, the USPTO has requested comments from the public on this position. The Federal Circuit has ruled, in In re Nuijten, that signals are not statutory subject matter, because articles of manufacture (the only plausible category under ) do not include intangible, incorporeal, transitory entities.

The USPTO was prompted to issue the guidelines by a recent decision by their board of appeals, Ex Parte Lundgren. However, they must produce a concrete, useful and tangible result. As indicated above, however, In re Bilski supersedes that legal test (as to the "useful, concrete, and tangible" test). The Bilski majority opinion also rejects the "technological arts" test, although three Federal Circuit judges (Mayer, dissenting, and Dyk and Linn, concurring) stated that they considered being technological an indispensable condition of patent-eligibility.

On May 22, 2019, in Washington D.C. a bipartisan, bicameral draft bill that would reform Section 101 of the Patent Act was released. It was proposed by the Chair of the Senate Judiciary Subcommittee on Intellectual Property Senator Thom Tillis (R-NC) and its Ranking Member, Senator Chris Coons (D-DE). They were joined by the House of Representatives Ranking Member of the House Judiciary Committee, Hank Johnson (D-GA-4), the Chairman of the House Judiciary Subcommittee on Intellectual Property and the Courts, and Representative Steve Stivers (R-OH-15) The proposal was released prior to a round-table the Senators and Representatives were holding the following day and intended to solicit feedback. Introduction of a bill has been delayed by lack of agreement among stakeholders such as the American Bar Association's IP law section, the IP Owner's Association, the American Intellectual Property Law Association and BIO.

Abstract ideas and patent-eligibility for computer-implemented inventions 

The Alice Supreme Court reduced the patent-eligibility of software patents or patents on software for business methods, excluding abstract ideas from the list of eligible subject matters. After much confusion within the patent examiners and patent practitioners, the USPTO prepared a list of examples of software patent claims that are deemed patent-eligible or not.

The algorithm exception and the patent-eligibility trilogy 

The exception to patenting algorithms arose out of three Supreme Court cases commonly referred to as the "Supreme Court Trilogy" or "patent-eligibility trilogy". This is a designation for three Supreme Court cases (Gottschalk v. Benson, Parker v. Flook, and Diamond v. Diehr) decided within a decade on whether, and in what circumstances, a claimed invention was within the scope of the US patent system (that is, was eligible to be considered for a patent grant). The three cases of the trilogy can be harmonized on the basis of when a claimed implementation of an idea or principle is old or departs from the prior art in only a facially trivial way, the claim is patent-ineligible (as Nielson and Morse said, and Flook reaffirmed, it must be treated as if in the prior art).

Gottschalk v. Benson

The invention in this case was a method of programming a general-purpose digital computer using an algorithm to convert binary-coded decimal numbers into pure binary numbers. The Supreme Court noted that phenomena of nature, mental processes and abstract intellectual concepts were not patentable, since they were the basic tools of scientific and technological work. However, new and useful inventions derived from such discoveries are patentable. The Court found that the discovery in Benson was unpatentable since the invention, an algorithm, was no more than abstract mathematics. Despite this holding, the Court emphasized that its decision did not preclude computer software from being patented, but rather precluded the patentability of software where the only useful characteristic was an algorithm. The Court further noted that validating this type of patent would foreclose all future use of the algorithm in question. Therefore, like the traditional exceptions to patentable subject matter, the purpose of the algorithm exception was to encourage development of new technologies by not granting patents that would preclude others from using abstract mathematical principles.

Parker v. Flook

The invention in this case was a method of calculating alarm limits by using a "smoothing algorithm" to make the system responsive to trends but not momentary fluctuations in process variables (such as temperature). Because it was conceded that the implementation of the algorithm was conventional, the Court found that the inventor did not even purport to have invented anything on which a patent could be granted. The Court did so on the basis of the principle that the nonstatutory subject matter (the algorithm) must be regarded as already in the prior art. Therefore, there was nothing left on which a patent could issue. In a case in which a patent was sought on an implementation of a principle (the algorithm), the implementation itself must be inventive for a patent to issue. Since that was not so, the Court held that the patent office had properly rejected Flook's claim to a patent. The Court relied on the decision in Neilson v. Harford, an English case that the Supreme Court had relied upon in O'Reilly v. Morse, for the proposition that an idea or principle must be treated as if it were already in the prior art, irrespective of whether it was actually new or old. This approach is something like that of analytic dissection in computer-software copyright law, although its use in patent law preceded its use in copyright law by a century or more.

Diamond v. Diehr

On March 3, 1981, the United States Supreme Court backed away from the analytic dissection approach, and insisted that patent-eligibility must be decided on the basis of the claim (or invention) considered as a whole. The requirement of bypassing analytic dissection is found in the statute, but only for section 103 (governing obviousness or inventive step) and not for section 101 (governing patent-eligibility). Despite this difference in emphasis, however, Diehr can be harmonized with Flook and Benson, and the Diehr Court studiously avoided stating that Flook and Benson were overruled or limited.

Bilski v. Kappos

On June 28, 2010, the United States Supreme Court ruled in Bilski v. Kappos that Bernard Bilski's patent application for a method of hedging the seasonal risks of buying energy is an abstract idea and is therefore unpatentable.  However, it also said that business methods are not inherently unpatentable, and was silent on the subject of software patents.  The majority opinion also said that the Federal Circuit's "machine or transformation" test, while useful, is not an exclusive test for determining the patentability of a process.  Instead, the Supreme Court reviewed the "Supreme Court Trilogy" described above and said that future decisions should be grounded in the examples and concepts expressed in those opinions.  As has been reported, the decision leaves many questions unanswered, including the patentability of many medical diagnostic technologies and software.  In May 2013, the Federal Circuit handed down an en banc decision in CLS Bank v. Alice   applying the various concepts in the "Supreme Court Trilogy".  The claims at issue were found unpatentable by a narrow margin, but the differences in positions of the various judges on the panel were dramatic  and not definitive.

Mayo Collaborative Services v. Prometheus Laboratories

On March 20, 2012, the United States Supreme Court ruled in Mayo Collaborative Services v. Prometheus Laboratories, Inc. that a process patent, which Prometheus Laboratories had obtained for correlations between blood test results and patient health in determining an appropriate dosage of a specific medication for the patient, is not eligible for a patent because the correlation is a law of nature.  The court reasoned “the steps in the claimed processes (aside from the natural laws themselves) involve well-understood, routine, conventional activity previously engaged in by researchers in the field.” The decision has been criticized for conflating two separate patent law concepts (patent eligibility under Section 101 and obviousness for patentability under Section 103), and potentially invalidating many patents relating to the biotech, medical diagnostics and pharmaceutical industries. Others, such as the American Medical Association (AMA), praised the decision for invalidating patents that would have hampered the ability of physicians to provide quality patient care. Under Section 287(c) of the Patent Act, however, a claim of patent infringement cannot be maintained against a medical practitioner for performing a medical activity, or against a related health care entity with respect to such medical activity, unless the medical practitioner is working in a clinical diagnostic laboratory.

Association for Molecular Pathology v. Myriad Genetics

On June 13, 2013, the United States Supreme Court in Association for Molecular Pathology v. Myriad Genetics held that patent claims directed to isolated DNA used for detecting a patient's genetic propensity of contracting breast cancer were not patentable subject matter.

Diamond v. Chakrabarty

On June 16, 1980, the United States Supreme Court ruled in Diamond v. Chakrabarty that a living non-naturally genetically modified bacterium is patent eligible as a composition of matter under 35 U.S.C. § 101, which provides for the issuance of a patent to a person who invents or discovers "any" new and useful "manufacture" or "composition of matter." As a result of the ruling, the patented invention included claims drawn to a non-naturally occurring bacterium that was genetically modified to be capable of degrading hydrocarbons. This ruling set the precedent for animate material as patentable subject matter.

Japan

Legal controversies 

The question of what should and should not be patentable subject matter has spawned a number of battlegrounds in recent years, setting against each other those in each area supporting patentability, claiming that patents would cause increased innovation and public good, against opponents with views that patentability is being sought only for private good but would do public harm.

Flashpoints have included the patenting of naturally occurring biological material, genetic sequences, stem cells, "traditional knowledge," programs for computers, and business methods.

In March 2010, a federal district court judge in the Southern District of New York ruled against Myriad Genetics and in favor of the American Civil Liberties Union that purified DNA sequences and the inventions using them are unpatentable. As has been discussed, Judge Sweet relied entirely upon Supreme Court precedent and ignored contrary case law of the Federal Circuit Court of Appeals to conclude that isolated DNA is of the same fundamental quality as natural DNA and is thus unpatentable under section 101 of the Patent Act; and that the method claims of the patents were abstract mental processes that were also unpatentable.  His rationale was controversial and his ruling was appealed to the Federal Circuit. The appeal court reversed the ruling deciding that isolated DNA had a "markedly different chemical structure" from other human genetic material. In 2013 The US Supreme Court partly reversed the decision again deciding that DNA was not patentable, Justice Antonin Scalia writing "the portion of the DNA isolated from its natural state sought to be patented is identical to that portion of the DNA in its natural state". However, the Supreme Court also decided that complementary DNA can be patented because it is not naturally occurring. When the news was announced ACLU welcomed the decision and Myriad Genetics share prices rose.

In October 2015, the High Court of Australia ruled against Myriad Genetics, holding that a mutated gene associated with susceptibility to breast cancer cannot give rise to a patentable invention under Australian law.

See also 
 Computer programs and the Patent Cooperation Treaty
 Software patents under the European Patent Convention
 Software patents under TRIPs Agreement
 Software patents under United Kingdom patent law

References and notes

Further reading 
 Peter Mole, Economics, ethics and the subject-matter definition of the EPC, The CIPA Journal, April 2003
 Justine Pila, The Requirement for an Invention in Patent Law, Oxford University Press, 2010, 
 Emir Crowne, The Utilitarian Fruits Approach to Justifying Patentable Subject Matter (June 19, 2011). John Marshall Review of Intellectual Property Law, Vol. 10, No. 4, p. 753, 2011.
 Emir Crowne, What is an Invention? A Review of the Literature on Patentable Subject Matter (September 3, 2009). Richmond Journal of Law and Technology, Vol. 15, No. 2, 2008.
  Stephen Ornes, Should business be allowed to patent mathematics?, New Scientist, 18 March 2013

External links
 Typepad.com, Ex parte Lundgren (U.S. Board of Patent Appeals and Interferences, October 2005), especially the dissent of Judge Barrett, which contains a lengthy presentation of statutory subject matter following page 19.
 Patent.gov, UK Patent Office Manual of Patent Practice section on patentability.

Patent law